RBC Centre is an office tower in Toronto, Ontario, Canada.

RBC Centre or RBC Center may also refer to the following:
 RBC Centre, an arena in Dartmouth, Nova Scotia 
 PNC Arena (formerly RBC Center), an arena in Raleigh, North Carolina, United States
 Progressive Auto Sales Arena (formerly RBC Centre), an arena in Sarnia, Ontario, Canada